Polan Sarkar (10 September 1921 – 1 March 2019) was a Bangladeshi social activist. He received the Ekushey Padak for social service from the Government of Bangladesh in 2011. He started a social movement of distributing books for free. He is known as “Alor Ferrywala,” the distributor of light.

Biography
Sarkar was born as Harez Uddin on September 10, 1921 in Bagatipara, Natore. When he was just five months old, his father died. After the incident, he moved to Bausha village with his mother and grandfather. He was admitted to a local school, but could not continue his study due to his family's financial troubles. Though his passion for studying and reading books did not ebb.

He started to work with the theatre artists in his area. He also developed a habit of buying books from local libraries as well. Within a short time Polan became fluent in Bangla and was hired to write legal deeds, keeping meeting minutes and business agreements.

Death
Sarkar passed away on March 1, 2019.

References

1921 births
2019 deaths
People from Natore District
Bangladeshi activists
Recipients of the Ekushey Padak